Lyudmyla Kichenok and Jeļena Ostapenko defeated Nicole Melichar-Martinez and Ellen Perez in the final, 7–6(7–5), 6–3 to win the women's doubles tennis title at the 2022 Cincinnati Open.

Samantha Stosur and Zhang Shuai were the defending champions, but chose not to compete together. Stosur partnered Latisha Chan, but they lost in the first round to Anna Danilina and Beatriz Haddad Maia. Zhang partnered Ena Shibahara, they lost in the second round to Danilina and Haddad Maia.

Coco Gauff, Elise Mertens and Kateřina Siniaková were in contention for the WTA No. 1 doubles ranking. Gauff retained the top ranking despite withdrawing from the tournament, following Siniaková's loss in the second round and Mertens' loss in the semifinals.

Seeds
The top four seeds received a bye into the second round.

Draw

Finals

Top half

Bottom half

Seeded teams
The following are the seeded teams, based on WTA rankings as of August 8, 2022.

Other entry information

Wild cards

Protected ranking

Alternates
  Ekaterina Alexandrova /  Aliaksandra Sasnovich
  Caroline Garcia /  Petra Martić

Withdrawals
  Coco Gauff /  Jessica Pegula → replaced by  Ekaterina Alexandrova /  Aliaksandra Sasnovich
  Emma Raducanu /  Elena Rybakina → replaced by  Caroline Garcia /  Petra Martić

References

External links
Main draw

Women's Doubles